Slava Moscow is a Russian rugby union club from Moscow. They participate in the Professional Rugby League, the premier rugby competition of Russia.  They play in yellow and red.

History

Honours
 USSR/Russian Championship (2): 1979, 1982
 Runner-up (5): 1976, 1977, 1985, 1986, 2008
 Soviet Cup (3): 1981, 1985, 1989

Club staff

Head coach – Levan Tsabadze 

Forwards coach – Sergey Popov

Current squad

2021

External links

Russian rugby union teams
Professional Rugby League teams